Kim Clifford (27 January 1961 – 2019) was an English actress.

Clifford was born on 27 January 1961. At the age of 13, she starred in the BAFTA TV Award winning television play Bar Mitzvah Boy.

She is possibly best known for her role as Sandra Hallam, wife of Sub Officer John Hallam, in London's Burning, whom she played from 1986 to 1997. She also made appearances in other television dramas, including Juliet Bravo, Not the Nine O'Clock News, Alas Smith and Jones and the sitcom Goodnight Sweetheart. She has also made an appearance in Only Fools and Horses in the 1985 episode 'To Hull & Back' as Vicky the barmaid at The Nag's Head.

Clifford was married to artist Lee Galpin, who was previously a fireman. They had a daughter, Michelle, and a son, Jack. She died in Medway, Kent in 2019, at the age of 58.

Filmography

References

External links
 

1961 births
2019 deaths
British television actresses